The regions of Eritrea are the primary geographical divisions through which Eritrea is administered. Six in total, they include the Central, Anseba, Gash-Barka, Southern, Northern Red Sea and Southern Red Sea regions.

At the time of independence in 1993 Eritrea was arranged into ten provinces. These provinces were similar to the nine provinces operating during the colonial period. In 1996, these were consolidated into six regions (zobas). Gash-Barka Region was the largest and the most densely populated region and is called the "bread-basket".

The People's Front for Democracy and Justice or PFDJ (originally Eritrean People's Liberation Front) rules the country and its regions as a single-party totalitarian government. The regional and local elections are conducted on a periodic basis on a restricted framework. All men and women of any ethnic or religious background are eligible to vote. No parties or groups other than PFDJ are allowed to contest and the elections are presided by representatives from PFDJ.

History
At the time of independence in 1993 Eritrea was arranged into ten provinces and they were Asmara (the capital of Eritrea), Akele Guzay,Barka, Denkalia, Gash-Setit, Hamasien, Sahel, Semhar and Seraye. These provinces were similar to the nine provinces operating during the colonial period. In 1996, these were consolidated into six regions (zobas). The boundaries of these new regions are based on catchment basins. Critics of this policy contend that the Government of Eritrea was erasing the historical fabric of Eritrea while proponents believe that these new Regional boundaries would ease historical land disputes. Furthermore proponents of this policy argue that basing boundaries on an important natural resource would ease the planning of its use.

Administration

Each region has a locally elected regional assembly while the local administrator is appointed by the President of Eritrea. During Cabinet meetings the President also meets with the Regional Administrators who report on the activities of their regions. The Regional Assemblies are charged with developing a budget for local programs and hearing the concerns of the local populations. Local programs included cultural events, infrastructure such as feeder roads, and to promote afforestation. Eritrea has a single-party National Assembly governed by the People's Front for Democracy and Justice or PFDJ (originally Eritrean Liberation Front), a totalitarian government. From the time of independence since 30 May 1991, the country has been continuing with a transitional government elected during the elections in April 1993. The scheduled elections in 2001 has been postponed indefinitely. The regional and local elections are conducted on a periodic basis on a restricted framework. All men and women of any ethnic or religious background are eligible to vote. No parties or groups other than PFDJ are allowed to contest and the elections are presided by representatives from PFDJ. Policy decisions should be centered around the party mandate and opposition and dissenters have been imprisoned.

Geography

The topography of the regions on the Western side, namely, Anseba, Central and  has highland plateau, which are cooler than the regions around the coastal plains. There are two rainy seasons, the heavier one during summer and the lighter one during spring. The climate and geography of the region along with other regions of Eritrea is similar to the one of Ethiopia.

There are a number of flora and fauna species in the high plateau regions in the West. Notably this was historic habitat for the endangered painted hunting dog (Lycaon pictus), a canid which is now thought to be extirpated from the region. Eritrea as a whole was extensively forested as recently as 1900. However, at present the total forest cover of Eritrea is less than one percent. Wildlife such as hamadryas baboons, Soemmerring's gazelle, dorcas gazelle, warthog, black-backed jackal, Ruppells sandfox, dikdik, African golden wolf, hyena, Abyssinian hare, wild ass and ostriches are found in this region. African wild dog was also found in the coastal region, but their present condition is unknown. There have been reports of cheetah occurring in this region, but there has been no evidence of their presence. It is extremely likely that both cheetah and wild dog are extinct in Eritrea.

Regions

Sub-Regions
The regions, followed by the sub-region,:

See also 
List of Eritrean regions by Human Development Index
ISO 3166-2:ER

References

External links

 
Subdivisions of Eritrea
Eritrea, Regions
Eritrea 1
Regions, Eritrea
Regions